Malzieu is a French surname. Notable people with the surname include:

Julien Malzieu (born 1983), French rugby union and sevens player
Mathias Malzieu (born 1974), French musician

See also
Le Malzieu (disambiguation)

French-language surnames